Last Summer is the first solo album released by American indie pop musician Eleanor Friedberger, most notable for being the vocalist in the band The Fiery Furnaces with her brother Matthew Friedberger. The album was released on 12 July 2011 on the Merge Records record label.

The album was announced as being in the making in April 2011 and released on July 12, 2011. Last Summer currently holds a 79 out of 100 rating on Metacritic.

Track listing

Personnel

Band Members
 Eric Broucek – Bass, Guitar, Keyboard, Percussion
 Eleanor Friedberger – Guitar, Harmonica, Keyboard, Percussion, Vocals
 Dylan Heaney – Tenor Saxophone
 Jim Orso – Drums
 Phil Rodriguez – Trumpet
 Tim Traynor – Drums
 Morgan Wiley – Keyboard

Technical
 Eric Broucek – Producer, Engineering, and Mixing
 Joe Lambert – Mastering
 Michael Rubenstein – Cover Photography
 Rebecca Benga – Back Cover Photography
 Beth Lieberman – Photography 
 Maggie Fost – Design

References

2011 debut albums
Eleanor Friedberger albums
Merge Records albums